is a song recorded by Japanese singer Shizuka Kudo for her fifteenth studio album, Jewelry Box. It was released as the album's leading single by Extasy Japan on November 8, 2000. It served as the theme song to the tanpatsu dramas aired between October 2000 and 2001 on AX's Kayō Suspense Gekijō time slot. "Shinku no Hana" is Kudo's first single to be released in 12 cm CD single format since "Again".

Background and composition
"Shinku no Hana" is Kudo's first single released through the label Extasy Japan. As per an initial press release, a cover of a Janet Jackson song was planned to be included on the CD single, but was eventually omitted. Originally titled , the title song "Shinku no Hana" was written and produced by X Japan member and Extasy Records founder Yoshiki. He is credited under the female pseudonym of Tomomi Tachibana (橘朋実) for the song's lyrics. The song is composed in the key of F minor and Kudo's vocals span from B3 to C5 in modal voice, and to C5 in head voice. Lyrically, the song deals with the theme of heartbreak. Yoshiki describes a protagonist dejected in love who compares love to a deep crimson-colored flower that eventually wilts and fades away because "nothing lasts forever".

Chart performance
The single debuted at number 33 on the Oricon Singles Chart, selling 10,000 copies in its first week. It fell to number 40 the following week, with sales of 6,000 copies. "Shinku no Hana" charted in the top 100 for four weeks, selling a total of 22,000 copies.

Track listing

Charts

References

2000 songs
2000 singles
2000s ballads
Pop ballads
Torch songs
Songs written by Yoshiki (musician)
Japanese television drama theme songs
Television drama theme songs
Shizuka Kudo songs
Extasy Japan singles